Claire Marie Huddart (born 22 December 1971) is an English former freestyle swimmer.

Swimming career
Huddart represented Great Britain at two consecutive Summer Olympics, starting in 1996. She won the 1998 ASA National Championship 200 metres freestyle title.

She represented England and won a gold medal in the  freestyle relay event and a silver medal in the  freestyle relay event, at the 1994 Commonwealth Games in Victoria, British Columbia, Canada. Four years later she represented England again and won two silver medals in the relay events, at the 1998 Commonwealth Games in Kuala Lumpur, Malaysia.

See also
 World record progression 4 × 200 metres freestyle relay

References

1971 births
Living people
English female swimmers
Olympic swimmers of Great Britain
Swimmers at the 1996 Summer Olympics
Swimmers at the 2000 Summer Olympics
English female freestyle swimmers
Sportspeople from Manchester
Medalists at the FINA World Swimming Championships (25 m)
European Aquatics Championships medalists in swimming
Commonwealth Games medallists in swimming
Commonwealth Games gold medallists for England
Commonwealth Games silver medallists for England
Universiade medalists in swimming
Swimmers at the 1994 Commonwealth Games
Swimmers at the 1998 Commonwealth Games
Universiade bronze medalists for Great Britain
Medallists at the 1994 Commonwealth Games
Medallists at the 1998 Commonwealth Games